Matthew Derek "Matt" Arya is a retired professional soccer player.

Early life and education 
Arya attended Monta Vista High School where he played soccer and was named to the all-county and all-peninsula teams. He originally went to college in 1990 at the University of California, Los Angeles where he played for one season on the UCLA Bruins men's soccer team. He transferred to Santa Clara University in 1991 and played for the Santa Clara Broncos men's soccer team. At Santa Clara, he scored 9 goals en route to being named to the 1991 all-West Coast Conference second team.

Arya attended De Anza College in 1992 and played for their men's soccer team. He finished the last two years of his collegiate career at the University of California, Santa Barbara and played for his brother, Mark Arya, who was the head coach of the UC Santa Barbara Gauchos men's soccer team. While at UCSB in 1994, he scored the second highest number of goals in one season with 15. He finished his UCSB career with 21 goals and 14 assists.

Professional soccer career 
After graduation from UC Santa Barbara, Arya turned professional and joined the Monterey Bay Jaguars for the 1995 USISL Professional League. He continued with the franchise through their rebrand to the California Jaguars for the 1996 USISL Select League. He also played in Brazil and Thailand.

Personal life 
Arya's brother, Mark Arya, also played soccer and served as the head coach of the UC Santa Barbara Gauchos men's soccer team. Following his professional career, Arya joined Colliers International.

References 

Living people
UCLA Bruins men's soccer players
Santa Clara Broncos men's soccer players
De Anza College alumni
UC Santa Barbara Gauchos men's soccer players
USISL players
Association football forwards
Year of birth missing (living people)
American soccer players